Irul is a 2021 Indian Malayalam-language mystery thriller film directed by Naseef Yusuf Izuddin in his directorial debut. The film is jointly produced by Anto Joseph Film Company and Plan J Studios, which stars Fahadh Faasil, Soubin Shahir and Darshana Rajendran. The film was released on streaming platform Netflix on 2 April 2021.

Plot 
Alex Parayil, a writer and businessman, and his girlfriend Archana Pillai plan to take a weekend off with no cell phones, where Alex pledges Archana a surprise. En route, their car breaks down in the rain, and the couple attempt to take shelter at a nearby house. At the house, they are taken in by the owner of the house, who tells them the telephone line is not working on account of the storm and permits them to stay the night. The trio gets to talking during which the eccentric house owner criticizes Alex’s book, ‘‘Irul’’, based on a real-life serial killer who killed five women brutally, as being inaccurate and heavily imaginative, rather than relying on actual facts and information. He comments that the motive of the killer for the killing was out of inquisitiveness, whilst Alex's told it was due to vengeance against women.

Mid-conversation, the power supply in the house gets cut, and Alex and the owner attempt to locate the main switch of the electricity in the basement. Suddenly, a gunshot is heard, and when Archana follows the sound, she sees Alex dragging the unconscious house owner back to the living room and tying him up, accusing the latter of being the serial killer upon whom Alex’s book was based. The owner wakes up and denies this, saying he is a thief who broke in and disconnected the phone line, but Alex refuses to allow Archana to make any call to the police, revealing that the house is his. Alex then reveals how he planned to bring Archana there and propose to her, but was surprised to find a stranger in his house, but decided to play along with, out of curiosity. They both provide contradicting stories of what happened in the basement, saying there was the corpse of a girl in there who was killed in the same manner as the serial killings, as Alex and Unni blame the murders on each other. Archana begins to question Alex’s innocence, as Unni reveals he found multiple rings in the house as opposed to the one ring that Alex showed, a gun that belonged to Alex, and the fact that Alex bought a cellphone when he prohibited Archana from doing so.

Eventually, the three land in the basement to check the corpse, where Alex begins to assault Unni, while Archana attempts to fire at Alex. Alex, on Unni’s provocation, decides to kill and bury the latter, as Archana concludes that Alex is the killer, and shoots him in the stomach. As Alex begins to succumb to the wound and asks Archana to leave the house, Unni creeps from behind her and gets her to pull the trigger, revealing himself as the killer. The following day, news of the discovery of the three corpses of Alex, Archana, and the girl identified as Vani Balan, is telecast with the report that the killer is still at large.

Cast 
 Fahadh Faasil as Unni
 Soubin Shahir as Alex Parayil, a novelist and also a businessman who loves Archana Pillai
 Darshana Rajendran as Archana Pillai, an advocate who loves Alex Parayil
 Jipa John as Vani balan, sixth victim.
 Mashar Hamsa as bookstore staff

Production 
Naseef Yusuf Izuddin worked as an assistant director in Bollywood films such as Kai Po Che!, Happy New Year, Raees, Newton, and Tumbbad. In September 2020, Naseef announced his directorial debut with a Malayalam film with Fahadh Faasil, Soubin Shahir and Darshana Rajendran titled as Irul with Plan J Studios, which earlier produced Thanneer Mathan Dinangal had bankrolled the film jointly with Anto Joseph Film Company. It is said to be a "riveting thriller" film only featuring three pivotal characters. The shooting of the film took place at Kuttikkanam on 16 September 2020. It is said to be a 30-days straight shoot within a single schedule, with most of the film being set indoors and was shot adhering to the COVID-19 safety protocols. Faasil's second film to be shot during the COVID-19 lockdown; the team had completed production on 20 October 2020.

Marketing and release

The trailer for the film was released by Netflix India on 18 March 2021, highlighting the film's scheduled release through Netflix on 2 April 2021.

Reception

Critical response
The film received mixed reviews.     
Shubhra Gupta from The Indian Express shared her review on the film stating "The set-up of this Fahadh Faasil and Soubin Shahir starrer has promise and the actors are up for it too. However, the story-telling lets them down." Anna MM Vetticad from Firstpost stated "Fahadh Faasil, Darshana Rajendran thriller is a damp squib." Janani K from India Today wrote in her review "Fahadh Faasil, Soubin Shahir and Darshana Rajendran will make you go wow with their performance. But, director Naseef Yusuf Izuddin and writer Sunil Yadav’s work leaves you wanting closure."

References

External links 
 

2021 films
Indian direct-to-video films
2021 direct-to-video films
2021 thriller films
Malayalam-language Netflix original films
2020s Malayalam-language films